Brass Monkey is a brand name of pre-mixed cocktails made by the Heublein Company.  As with many lesser-known cocktails that are named after colloquial expressions, widely differing recipes share the same name.

In the 1970s, '80s, and '90s, the Heublein Company produced the premixed cocktail labeled Brass Monkey. Heublein pre-mixed bottled cocktails were fairly inexpensive and provided a portable alternative to regular mixed drinks. Heublein was based in Stamford, Connecticut, and had production facilities in the Hartford, Connecticut, area. The Brass Monkey cocktail was available in bottles from half pint up to 750 ml. During the time Heublein produced Brass Monkey, liquor stores carried mostly beer, wine, and hard alcohol; very few premixed alternatives were available.

Steve Doniger, an advertising executive, named the brand after an alleged World War II spy named H. E. Rasske. Allan Kaufman, who crafted a series of stories about the spy, created the ad campaign using an old photo of his father as Rasske’s image.

In 1982, the R. J. Reynolds Tobacco Company acquired Heublein Inc. for $1.4 billion.  RJR Nabisco sold the division to Grand Metropolitan in 1987. Grand Metropolitan merged with Guinness to form Diageo in 1997.

Sales and popularity of Heublein's Brass Monkey spirit cocktails increased in the 1980s after the release of the Beastie Boys' song of the same name. It was widely and incorrectly believed that the Beastie Boys were referring to a different drink made from a 40-ounce container of malt liquor mixed with orange juice ("forty" is mentioned in the lyrics); however, Mike D has publicly confirmed that the premixed Heublein cocktail was their muse.

After several years of absence from the market, the Brass Monkey premixed cocktail reemerged in the late 2000s as The Club Brass Monkey as part of the Club Cocktails line of bottled mixed drinks produced by The Club Distilling Company (owned at the time by Diageo) but has since been discontinued.

References

Cocktails with rum
Cocktails with vodka